South Sudan uses a two digit mobile code along with a seven digit phone number. For international calls, South Sudan has been assigned the +211 code by the International Telecommunication Union (ITU). Before its secession, the area later to  be known as South Sudan used Sudan's ITU. However, even after its secession, South Sudan used the Sudan country code +249 until 1 October. The government of the nation said the code number +211 would become active within 48 hours of recognition of the country by the United Nations (UN). The UN recognized South Sudan on 14 July 2011, and in so the United Nations suggested the code to become active by 16 July. The code went "live" on 1 October 2011, over two months behind schedule.

Service Provider codes
Each telephone service provider has a two-digit identifier. The first digit is 1 for fixed services, including wireline and fixed wireless, or 9 for GSM mobile services.

National calls
Calls taking place inside of South Sudan have a simple format of mm nnn nnnn (where mm represents the mobile code and nnn nnnn represents the local number). An ITU is not required for national calls. For example, a person in South Sudan contacting another person in the same country with a mobile code of 55 and a local number of 555-5555 would have a telephone number of 55 555 5555.

International calls

Inbound
Calls from outside of South Sudan has a different dialing format needing to be used. International call prefixes, area codes, and phone numbers may vary. An inbound call has the format of +211 mm nnn nnnn (where mm represents the mobile code, and nnn nnnn represents the local number). This is also started off with the international call prefix respective to the country the call is coming from (for example, the United States and Canada use 011, and most other countries use 00). So for example, if someone from tried to call to the number 55-555-5555 in South Sudan from the United States, then one would use 011 211 55 555 5555.

References

South Sudan
Communications in South Sudan
Telephone numbers